St Michael's Church  in Framlingham, Suffolk is a Church of England church dedicated to Saint Michael. It was the burial site of the Howard family. The church was declared a Grade I listed building in 1966.

History

The Church of Saint Michael, Framlingham, has been built, rebuilt and added to down the ages. A surviving feature, the capitals of the chancel arch, date from the twelfth century, but the majority of the church was built in the Perpendicular style between 1350 and 1555. The roof is especially glorious with intricate fan tracery which conceal hammer beams. The roof itself dates from about 1521.

Framlingham was a major seat of the Earls and Dukes of Norfolk. Vast estates of the Norman Bigods were forfeited to Edward I and Framlingham came to Thomas of Brotherton, eldest son of Edward and Margaret of France. After many other changes of inheritance, in about 1635 Sir Robert Hitcham bequeathed the Framlingham estate to Pembroke College, Cambridge, who remain Lords of the Manor to this day. The church contains many fine tombs including that of Thomas Howard, 3rd Duke of Norfolk.

Bells
The church has a ring of 8 bells from a mixture of founders and date from between the 15th and 20th centuries. The ring was augmented to 8 with addition of 2 new trebles in 1718 cast by John Stephens of Norwich. The bells hang in oak frame made by George Day of Eye, Suffolk dating from 1892. The bells were overhauled by John Taylor & Co of Loughborough in 1990.

The 1708 Thamar Organ

One of the most noted features of the church is the world-famous Thamar organ. Only eight large-scale organs in total survived the English Civil War, and only three of those are Thamars. The other examples being in Gloucester Cathedral and St Nicholas's church in the hamlet of Stanford upon Avon, Northamptonshire.

The painted front pipes belong to the Thamar organ first built for the church's patrons, Pembroke College, Cambridge, by Thomas Thamar in 1674 just after the Restoration (celebrated by the hatchment on the south wall); the only other painted pipes of this style are to be found in Gloucester Cathedral. The case is believed to date back to before 1630 (maybe much earlier – 1580 has been mentioned) and some of the pipework may at least pre-date the Commonwealth.

In 1707 the college decided it would like a larger and more up to date organ by Father Smith for their Wren chapel; the Thamar organ came to St. Michael's in 1708 along with its case. It was placed on a gallery where it stayed until 1898. For a period the organ was moved about the church first to the north aisle and then into the chancel until 1970 when the gallery was recovered from the castle and reunited with the organ in its present position under the leadership of Michael Gillingham and with the aid of the Pilgrim Trust.

The organ's history contains many mysteries. One concerns the famous and historic organ builder John Byfield who worked on the organ during 1740 according to reports in the Ipswich Journal. When Hunter rebuilt the organ in 1898 he used most of Thamar's pipework on the great organ except for the cornet and trumpet which he replaced with a harmonic flute and gamba. The cornet went missing and the trumpet was lost. The swell incorporated at least three eighteenth-century stops.
 
The restoration by Bishop and Son of Ipswich in 1970 was sensitive and imaginative. The Thamar organ was restored with no additions or subtractions (apart from a board for bottom C#). The cornet was rediscovered in the Rectory attic and repaired, restored and reconstructed. A very old rank of trumpet pipes was found to replace the lost set. The swell was matched up to complement the great and based on its 18th-century content. The pedal was likewise treated. The Cromorne was introduced by John Budgen of Bishops and is an excellent and versatile addition to the swell organ. A pedal reed was also added. The organ specification is available at the National Pipe Organ Register.
 
The organ has illustrious associations: Mendelssohn is believed to have given lessons to Caroline Attwood when he visited her elder brother George Attwood, then Rector. Mendelssohn knew George's father, Thomas Attwood, composer and organist of St. Paul's Cathedral and one time pupil of Mozart.

Duke of Richmond

Henry FitzRoy, 1st Duke of Richmond and Somerset (1519–1536), an illegitimate son of Henry VIII of England by his mistress Elizabeth Blount, is buried in the church in an ornate tomb.

This tomb was indeed at Thetford, for Richmond died in 1536 and was first buried there at the Priory. He was the illegitimate son of Henry VIII, his mother being Elizabeth Blount, one of the ladies-in-waiting to Katherine of Aragon . The King promoted FitzRoy to high honours and titles for he was the only son who survived more than a few days of life, apart, of course, from the future Edward VI. In his desire to promote the interests of his family, the 3rd Duke of Norfolk had arranged with the King that his daughter Mary should become Richmond 's wife. The couple were betrothed but due to their tender years did not live together and the consummation of the marriage was prevented by the early death from consumption of Richmond when he was only 17. The responsibility for FitzRoy's burial was placed upon Norfolk by the King who seems to have lost interest in his son, once dead. After the dissolution of Thetford, the tomb and its body were brought to Framlingham and Mary Richmond, Norfolk 's daughter, was buried therein after her death in December 1557.

Howard family monuments

The church contains family burials of the Howard family (mostly moved after the dissolution of Thetford Priory)

Thomas Howard, 3rd Duke of Norfolk

The tomb of Thomas Howard stands immediately to the south of the high altar. Archeologically it bears comparison with anything in northern Europe if not perhaps in Italy . Around the four sides are the figures of the twelve Apostles together with Aaron and St Paul . On the south side there are St Matthew, St James the Great, St James the Less and St Andrew; on the west St Peter, Aaron and St Paul; on the north St Matthias, St Jude, St Simon and St Philip; and on the east St John, St Simeon(?) and St Thomas. These represent the last major display of religious imagery in England before the full weight of Reformation theology made such things impossible.

The design of the tomb is part-French and part-English and it is significant that it was commissioned, not by the Crown, but on behalf of the greatest nobleman in England . It is thought that parts, at least, of this tomb may have been incorporated in another which was at Thetford for Thomas Howard, 2nd Duke of Norfolk victor of Flodden . In turn, this man's father had been John Howard who had died fighting for Richard III at Bosworth and for whom the Norfolk dukedom had been created in the Howard name. It is known that there are two other male bodies interred in the 3rd Duke's tomb and it is an unproven supposition that these are the bodies of his father and grandfather, removed to Framlingham after the dissolution of Thetford Priory.

Wives of Thomas Howard, 4th Duke of Norfolk

He himself is buried at St Peter ad Vincula at the Tower of London, executed there for trying to make a 4th marriage to Mary I Stuart. In their robes of state and resting their heads and feet on emblems connected with their Houses, his wives Mary FitzAlan and Margaret Audley are represented, though only Margaret is buried here. The large space between the effigies is said to have been reserved for Norfolk himself, his third wife, or even Mary, Queen of Scots. The sides are decorated with their heraldic quarterings. It would seem that at some former period there were columns which supported a canopy over the monument which must have rendered it highly magnificent.

In 1842 this vault was opened and found to be empty but for a skull and some ashes. Tradition has it that the inhabitants of the town hid some of their valuables in the monument during the Jacobite rising of 1745 and swept it clean afterwards.

Henry Howard, Earl of Surrey

Before his own death in 1614 Henry Howard, 1st Earl of Northampton, Surrey's youngest son made arrangements for his father's and mother's remains to be removed to Framlingham and this monument portraying them both to be erected in 1614. The Latin inscription refers to Surrey as being the son of the Second Duke, which is technically correct as after the Battle of Bosworth the Dukedom was rendered extinct and the Second Duke became the First Duke of the new creation.

The tomb chest is not a religious example but rather extolling the virtues of its subjects. His two sons kneel at the foot end.  At the head end are Howard's three daughters: 
Jane, who wears a coronet 
in the centre is Katherine Howard, who married Henry Berkeley, 7th Baron Berkeley
Margaret who married Henry Scrope, 9th Baron Scrope of Bolton (1534–1592).

By about 1976 the whole monument was subsiding in the centre and the ends collapsing in on itself. The restoration was entrusted to John Green and the monument was duly cleaned and restored to its full brilliance. It was when it was being cleaned that Mr Green found the dowel holes next to Surrey's calf where there once was a coronet (not worn, since he died in disgrace). A new coronet was made of lead casting with large fish weights for the baubles, the whole thing was then painted, gilded, and placed in position.

In fiction

The church is one of a number of locations in Framlingham that plays a role in the mystery novel Magpie Murders by Anthony Horowitz.

References

External links
 
 Framlingham website with pages on St Michael's Church. Many large photographs of the interior and a sound file of the Thamar organ.

+
Framlingham
Framlingham
Framlingham